Aaron Fairooz (born November 10, 1983, in Arlington, Texas) is a former Canadian football wide receiver. Fairooz signed as a free agent on March 19, 2010, with the Saskatchewan Roughriders. He was released by the Riders on September 6, 2011.

References

External links
Saskatchewan Roughriders bio
http://www.fairoozimaging.com

1983 births
Living people
Canadian football wide receivers
Hamilton Tiger-Cats players
Sportspeople from Arlington, Texas
Saskatchewan Roughriders players
Arkansas Twisters players
Winnipeg Blue Bombers players
Dallas Vigilantes players
Spokane Shock players